Charles Asher "Spades" Wood (January 13, 1909 in Spartanburg, South Carolina – May 18, 1986 in Wichita, Kansas) was a professional baseball pitcher. He attended Wofford College and played two seasons in Major League Baseball from 1930-31 for the Pittsburgh Pirates.

External links

Major League Baseball pitchers
Pittsburgh Pirates players
Salisbury-Spencer Colonials players
Wichita Aviators players
Tulsa Oilers (baseball) players
Kansas City Blues (baseball) players
St. Joseph Saints players
Cooleemee Weavers players
Baseball players from South Carolina
1909 births
1986 deaths
Sportspeople from Spartanburg, South Carolina